The Wild Animals in Captivity Protection Act 1900 (63 & 64 Vict. c.33), long title An Act for the prevention of cruelty to wild animals in captivity, was an Act of Parliament of the Parliament of the United Kingdom, given the Royal Assent on 6 August 1900 and since repealed.

The Act covered any animals not encompassed by the Cruelty to Animals Act 1849 and the Cruelty to Animals Act 1854, and made it an offence to cause, or permit to be caused, any unnecessary suffering to such an animal held in captivity. To "cruelly abuse, infuriate, tease, or terrify" it, or to permit another to do so, was also an offence. The penalty was imprisonment with or without hard labour for up to three months, or a fine of up to five pounds.

Any action done in the course of killing or preparing an animal for food was exempt, as was any act permitted by the Cruelty to Animals Act 1876, or the hunting of any animal provided that it had not been released in a mutilated or injured state.

The Act was repealed by the Protection of Animals Act 1911 and the Protection of Animals Act 1912.

See also 
 Wild Birds Protection Act 1902
 Animal welfare in the United Kingdom

References
 The public general acts passed in the sixty-third and sixty-third and sixty-fourth years of the reign of her majesty Queen Victoria. London: printed for Her Majesty's Stationery Office. 1900.
 Chronological table of the statutes; HMSO, London. 1993.

United Kingdom Acts of Parliament 1900
Repealed United Kingdom Acts of Parliament
Animal welfare and rights legislation in the United Kingdom